

Notes

References
Footnotes

Sources

NME
New Musical Express
1950s in British music
1960s in British music